The Sinti (also Sinta or Sinte; masc. sing. Sinto; fem. sing. Sintesa) are a subgroup of Romani people mostly found in Germany and Central Europe that number around 200,000 people. They were traditionally itinerant, but today only a small percentage of Sinti remain unsettled. In earlier times, they frequently lived on the outskirts of communities. The Sinti of Central Europe (mostly Germany) are closely related to the group known as Manouche in France. They speak the Sinti-Manouche variety of Romani, which exhibits strong German influence. The origin of the Sinti people, as with the broader Romani people, lies generally in the Indian subcontinent; while people from the western Indian subcontinent's region of Sindh were mentioned in 1100 by the Arab chronicler Meidani, it is unclear if the Sindhi people are the ancestors of modern-day Sinti, though what is clear is that the Sinti, as with other Romani people,  generally originate in the northern Indian subcontinent.

Etymology and origin 
The origin of the name is disputed. Scholar Jan Kochanowski, and many Sinti themselves, believed it derives from Sindhi, the name of a people of Sindh in medieval India (a region now in southeast Pakistan). Scholar Yaron Matras argued that "Sinti" is a later term in use by the Sinti from only the 18th century on, and is likely a European loanword. Romani linguist Ronald Lee stated that the name's origin probably lies in the German word 'Reisende' ('travellers').

A recent study by Estonian and Indian researchers found genetic similarities between European Romani men and Indian men in their sample. Linguist N. B. G. Kazi stated that all Romani people are from Sindh.

History 
The Sinti are a subgroup of Romani people mostly found in Germany. They arrived in Austria and Germany in the Late Middle Ages as part of the Romani emigration from the Indian Subcontinent, eventually splitting into two groups: Eftavagarja ("the Seven Caravans") and Estraxarja ("from Austria"). They arrived in Germany before 1540. The two groups expanded, the Eftavagarja into France, Portugal and Brazil, where they are called "Manouches", and the Estraxarja into Italy and Central Europe, mainly what are now Croatia, Slovenia, Hungary, Romania, the Czech Republic and Slovakia, eventually adopting various regional names.

The Holocaust 

The Sinti migrated to Germany in the early 15th century. Despite their long presence, they were still generally regarded as beggars and thieves, and, by 1899, the police kept a central register on Sinti, Roma, and Yenish peoples. Nazi Germany considered them racially inferior (see Nazism and race), and persecuted them throughout Germany during the Nazi periodthe Nuremberg Laws of 1935 often being interpreted to apply to them as well as the Jews.

Adolf Eichmann recommended that Nazi Germany solve the "Gypsy Question" simultaneously with the Jewish Question, resulting in the deportation of the Sinti to clear room to build homes for ethnic Germans. Some were sent to Poland, or elsewhere (including some deported to Yugoslavia by the Hamburg Police in 1939) others were confined to designated areas, and many were eventually murdered in gas chambers. Many Sinti and Roma were taken to Auschwitz-Birkenau, where they were put in a special section, called the "gypsy camp". Josef Mengele often performed some of his infamous experiments on Sinti and Roma. On 2 August 1944 the "gypsy camp" was closed, and approximately 4,000 Sinti and Roma were gassed during the night of 2–3 August and burnt in the crematoria. The date 2 August is commemorated as Roma and Sinti Holocaust Remembrance Day.

In the concentration camps, the Sinti were forced to wear either a black triangle, indicating their classification as "asocial", or a brown triangle, specifically reserved for Sinti, Roma, and Yenish peoples.

See also
 Antiziganism
 History of the Romani people
 Romani people by country
 Romani people in Austria
 Romani people in Germany
 Sindhi diaspora
 Sinte Romani (language)

Citations

General and cited references

Further reading 
 Walter Winter, Struan Robertson (translator). Winter Time: Memoirs of a German Who Survived Auschwitz. Hertfordshire Publications, (2004), .
 Reviewed by Emma Brockes: "We had the same pain", The Guardian, November 29, 2004.
 Sinti and Roma: Gypsies in German-speaking Society and Literature
 Sinti and Roma: Legal Status and Perspectives for a European Minority
 Roma in Europe: The Politics of Collective Identity Formation

External links 

 Non-Jewish Victims of Persecution in Nazi Germany on the Yad Vashem website
 Wege nach Ravensbrück (Ravensbrück concentration camp: Memories of surviving female Sinti) 
 F. N. Finck, Lehrbuch des Dialekts der deutschen Zigeuner (1903) in the Internet Archive 

 
Ethnic groups in Germany
Romani groups
Romani in Europe
Romani in Germany

hi:सिंटि